The 2019–20 season was Rayo Vallecano's 95th season in existence and the club's first season back in the second division of Spanish football. In addition to the domestic league, Rayo Vallecano participated in this season's edition of the Copa del Rey. The season was slated to cover a period from 1 July 2019 to 30 June 2020. It was extended extraordinarily beyond 30 June due to the COVID-19 pandemic in Spain.

Players

Current squad

Out on loan

Pre-season and friendlies

Competitions

Overview

Segunda División

League table

Results summary

Results by round

Matches
The fixtures were revealed on 4 July 2019.

Copa del Rey

References

External links

Rayo Vallecano seasons
Rayo Vallecano